Naser Al-Halawi (born January 10, 1979) is a Saudi Arabian footballer who playing with Al-Faisaly (Harmah), he was playing for many clubs including Al-Nassr.

References

External links
 http://www.kooora.com/default.aspx?player=5905

1979 births
Living people
Saudi Arabian footballers
Saudi Arabia international footballers
Al Nassr FC players
Al-Faisaly FC players
Najran SC players
Al-Watani Club players
Al-Diriyah Club players
Al-Washm Club players
Al-Asyah Club players
Al-Waseel FC players
Sportspeople from Riyadh
Saudi First Division League players
Saudi Second Division players
Saudi Professional League players
Saudi Fourth Division players
Association football defenders